Ibrahim Ali may refer to:
Ibrahim Ali (1872–1931), Islamic scholar and poet
Ibrahim Ali (France) (1978–1995), French teenage shooting victim
Ibrahim Ali (Malaysia) (born 1951), Malaysian nativist politician
Ibrahim Ali (athlete), Paralympic athlete from Egypt
Ibrahim Ali (UAE), footballer (soccer player) from United Arab Emirates
Ibrahim Ali (Iraq) (born 1950), footballer (soccer player) from Iraq